Richard Konvička (30 April 1957 – 6 August 2021) was a Czech painter.

References

1957 births
2021 deaths
20th-century Czech painters
21st-century Czech painters
Artists from Prague